Daniele Fontecchio (born 29 December 1960) is a retired Italian hurdler.

Biography
His personal best time was 13.66 seconds, achieved in August 1985 in Moscow.

Achievements

National titles
He won 10 national championships at individual senior level.
Italian Athletics Championships
100 m hs: 1981, 1982, 1983, 1984, 1985, 1986
Italian Indoor Athletics Championships
60 m hs: 1982, 1983, 1984, 1985

References

External links
 

1960 births
Living people
Italian male hurdlers
Athletes (track and field) at the 1984 Summer Olympics
Olympic athletes of Italy
Athletics competitors of Fiamme Oro
Mediterranean Games bronze medalists for Italy
Athletes (track and field) at the 1983 Mediterranean Games
World Athletics Championships athletes for Italy
Mediterranean Games medalists in athletics
Sportspeople from Pescara
20th-century Italian people
21st-century Italian people